I'll Tell You What is the third studio album by American electronic musician RP Boo. It was released in July 2018 under Planet Mu.

Release
On May 11, 2018, RP Boo announced the release of his third album, along with the single "Back From The Future".

Critical reception
I'll Tell You What was met with "generally favorable" reviews from critics. At Metacritic, which assigns a weighted average rating out of 100 to reviews from mainstream publications, this release received an average score of 79, based on 11 reviews. Aggregator Album of the Year gave the release a 76 out of 100 based on a critical consensus of 10 reviews.

Accolades

Track listing

References

2018 albums
Planet Mu albums